General elections were held in Barbados on 18 June 1981. The result was a victory for the ruling Barbados Labour Party, which won 17 of the 27 seats. Voter turnout was 71.6%.

This was the first election to take place after the Representation of the People (Amendment) Act (1980) had increased the number of seats in the House of Assembly of Barbados from 24 to 27, the first such expansion since 1843.

Results

References

Barbados
1981 in Barbados
Elections in Barbados
June 1981 events in North America